Chennai is a very large city in Tamil Nadu, India.

Chennai may also refer to:
 Chennai district
 Chennai metropolitan area
 Greater Chennai Corporation
 Chennai International Airport
 Chennai Port
 Chennai Public School
 Chennai railway division
 INS Chennai (D65), a guided missile destroyer of the Indian Navy

See also
 Chennai City F.C.
 Chennai Institute of Technology
 Madras (disambiguation)